The Korea 2022 FIFA World Cup bid was the second official bid from the Korea Football Association or the KFA. If this bid was successful, Korea would have been hosting their second World Cup Finals and it would have been their first solo hosting since they shared the 2002 FIFA World Cup with other co-host Japan. Despite recent tensions, Han Sung-joo, chairman of the bid committee hoped to involve North Korea if South Korea received the bid.

Schedule

Candidate venues

Notes

Official Bid Partners
 Hana Bank
 Samsung 
 Hyundai 
 Korean Air

References

South Korea
2010 in South Korea
South Korea at the 2022 FIFA World Cup